Alexandra Jiménez Arrechea (born 4 January 1980) is a Spanish actress. She became popular for her role as África Sanz in the sitcom Los Serrano. She starred in the TV series La pecera de Eva, broadcast between 2010 and 2011. Between 2015 and 2016 she hosted the stand-up comedy show .

Biography 
She was born in Zaragoza on 4 January 1980. When Jiménez was young, she started dancing ballet and trained at the Zaragoza's Estudio de Danza María de Ávila and the Madrid's Real Conservatorio Profesional de Danza. She became a professional ballet dancer when she was 15 years old, but after she suffered an injury when she was working for the Cuban National Ballet she set out on her career towards acting.

In 2004, she joined Los Serrano, where she played África Sanz.

Between 2010 and 2011, she starred in the TV series La pecera de Eva, playing the main role of Eva Padrón, a psychologist dedicated to solving the problems of a group of teenagers.

She replaced Eva Hache as hostess of the TV stand-up comedy show  in La Sexta, hosting the show between 2015 and 2016.

Filmography 

Television

Film

Theatre

Fin del mundo, todos al tren (2002)
Los menecomos (2002)
Siete por siete (2003)
5mujeres.com (2004)
Hombres, mujeres y punto
Un pequeño juego, sin consecuencias (2006)

Awards and nominations
Actors and Actresses Union Awards
2006: Television: Performance in a Minor Role, Female (Los Serrano) – Nominated

References

External links
 

1980 births
Living people
People from Zaragoza
Spanish stage actresses
Actresses from Aragon
Spanish television actresses
Spanish film actresses